Archduchess Maria Anna of Austria (27 October 1835 – 5 February 1840) was by birth an Archduchess of Austria and a member of the House of Habsburg. She was the fourth child and only daughter to Archduke Franz Karl of Austria and Princess Sophie of Bavaria. Maria Anna died in childhood due to epilepsy.

Life

Named in honor of her paternal aunt Maria Anna of Savoy, Archduchess Maria Anna of Austria was born on 27 October 1835, in Vienna, Austria. Her father was Archduke Franz Karl of Austria and her mother was Princess Sophie of Bavaria. She was baptized with the names of Maria Anna Karolina Annunziata Johanna Josepha Gabriela Theresa Katharina Margaretha Philomena, although in the family she was called Ännchen.

At birth, she seemed to be robust, however, she soon started to show signs of epilepsy, and had died at the early age of 4 after a violent seizure. She was buried in the Ferdinand Vault at the Imperial Crypt, in Vienna.

Ancestry

Notes

References

Bibliography
 Egon Caesar Conte Corti: Vom Kind zum Kaiser. Die Jugend Kaiser Franz Josefs und seiner Brüder. Band 1 von Kaiser Franz Joseph I. Pustet, 1950.
 Cölestin Wolfsgruber: Die Kaisergruft bei den Kapuzinern in Wien. ed. Alfred Hölder, 1887, N°. 87, p. 307 ff. online 
 Constantin von Wurzbach: Habsburg, Franz Karl Joseph in: Biographisches Lexikon des Kaiserthums Oesterreich,  vol. 6. Kaiserlich-königliche Hof- und Staatsdruckerei, Vienna 1861, p. 357 online

1835 births
1840 deaths
House of Habsburg-Lorraine
Austrian princesses
Burials at the Imperial Crypt
People with epilepsy
Deaths from epilepsy
Royalty and nobility who died as children